A gravity hill, also known as a magnetic hill, mystery hill, mystery spot, gravity road, or anti-gravity hill, is a place where the layout of the surrounding land produces an optical illusion, making a slight downhill slope appear to be an uphill slope. Thus, a car left out of gear will appear to be rolling uphill against gravity. Hundreds of gravity hills are recognized worldwide.  

The slope of gravity hills is an optical illusion, although sites are often accompanied by claims that magnetic or supernatural forces are at work. The most important factor contributing to the illusion is a completely or mostly obstructed horizon. Without a horizon, it becomes difficult for a person to judge the slope of a surface, as a reliable reference is missing. Objects which one would normally assume to be more or less perpendicular to the ground, such as trees, may be leaning, offsetting the visual reference.

A 2003 study looked into how the absence of a horizon can skew the perspective on gravity hills, by recreating a number of antigravity places in the lab to see how volunteers would react. As a conclusion, researchers from Universities of Padova and Pavia in Italy found that without a true horizon in sight, the human brain could be tricked by common landmarks such as trees and signs.

The illusion is similar to the Ames room, in which objects can also appear to roll against gravity.

The opposite phenomenon—an uphill road that appears flat—is known in bicycle racing as a "false flat".

See also
 List of gravity hills
 The Crooked House – a building with an internal gravity hill optical illusion.

References

External links